Pashto dialects ( də Pəx̌tó žәbgóṭi) can be divided into two large varieties: Northern Pashto and Southern Pashto. Each of the two varieties of Pashto is further divided into a number of dialects. Northern Pashto is spoken in eastern Afghanistan, and central, northern and eastern Khyber Pakhtunkhwa (including Peshawar). Southern Pashto is spoken to the south of it, in southern and western Afghanistan (including Kandahar), southern Khyber Pakhtunkhwa and northern Balochistan (including Quetta). 'Ethnologue' divides Pashto into Northern, Southern and Central Pashto, and Wanetsi.

Overview
According to David Neil MacKenzie , a consonant shift took place in the northern parts of Pashtunistan in several phases in the medieval era. During the shift, the retroflex fricative ṣ̌  changed to x̌  or to x , while ẓ̌  changed to ǵ  or to g . That is supported by the linguist Georg Morgenstierne's assertion that the Pashto script developed in the Northeast which had the phonology of a Southwestern Pashto in the 16th century. The shift was likely complete before the Pashto book Khayr al-Bayān was written by Bayazid Pir Roshan from Waziristan in 1651. According to Michael M. T. Henderson in Balochistan [Southeast]: the spilt ṣ̌  into š  and ẓ̌  into ž  may never have occurred in that they were always pronounced as š  and ž  there or that a split did occur.

Among the other Eastern Iranian languages outside Pashto, the Shughni (Khughni) and Yazgulyami branch of the Pamir languages also seem to have been affected from the ṣ̌ to x consonant shift. E.g. "meat": ɡuṣ̌t in Wakhi and ğwáṣ̌a in Southwestern Pashto, but changes to guxt in Shughni and ğwáxa in Northerneastern Pashto.

Classification
1. Southern variety
Abdali dialect (or South Western dialect)
Kakar dialect (or South Eastern dialect)
Shirani dialect
Marwat-Bettani dialect
Southern Karlani group
Khattak dialect
Banuchi dialect
Dawarwola dialect
Masidwola dialect
Wazirwola dialect

2. Northern variety
Central Ghilji dialect (or North Western dialect)
Yusufzai dialect (or North Eastern dialect)
Northern Karlani group
Taniwola dialect
Khosti dialect
Zadran dialect
Mangal dialect
Afridi dialect
Khogyani dialect
Wardak dialect

3. Waṇetsi Dialect

Standards

Regional standards
There are several regional standard forms of Pashto which have high prestige, and serve as a means of communication between the various tribal communities in those regions.

Central Pashto 
Central Pashto dialects are also referred to as middle dialects.

Southern regional standard
Southern Pashto compromises of the South Western and South Eastern dialects.

Southern Western Pashto, also called Kandahari Pashto, is the prestige variety of Pashto in southern and western Afghanistan.

A similar variety known as South Eastern is spoken in the Balochistan province of Pakistan.

Northern regional standard
Northern Pashto compromises of the North Western and North Eastern dialects.

North Eastern Pashto, also called Eastern Pashto, is the prestige variety of Pashto, known as Yusufzai Dialect, it is spoken in central, northern, and eastern parts of the Khyber Pakhtunkhwa province of Pakistan and in northeastern Afghanistan.

North Western Pashto is spoken, in eastern and northeastern Afghanistan, in the central Ghilji or Ghilzai region.

Tareeno

Although this dialect is spoken only by the Spin Tareens and not the Tor Tareens, it is known locally as Tareeno and by Western academics as Wanetsi. It is the most distinct amongst the dialects of Pashto.

Features 

Variations have been noted in dialects of Pashto. The differences between the standard varieties of Pashto are primarily phonological, and there are simple conversion rules. The morphological differences between the standard varieties are very few and unimportant. Two of the key phonemes whose pronunciation vary between the different Pashto dialects are ښ and ږ. The southern dialect of Kandahar is considered to be the most conservative with regards to phonology. It retains the original pronunciation of these two phonemes as voiceless and voiced retroflex sibilants, respectively, and does not merge them into other phonemes unlike the northern dialects.

The dialects spoken by the tribes from the Karlani confederacy of Pashtuns are lexicologically different and very varied. Moreover, the Karlani dialects have a tendency towards a change in the pronunciation of vowels. Depending on the particular dialect, the standard Pashto [a], [ā], [o], [u] may change into [ā], [â/å/o], [ȯ/ȫ/e], [i], respectively. In the Karlani dialects of Waziristan, Bannu, and Tani (southern Khost), which follow the vowel shift to the greatest extent, these four vowels normally change into [ā], [o], [e], [i], respectively.

The nine phonemes represented in the column headings below show key phonetic differences between the dialects. Five of them are consonants written in the Pashto alphabet, and four are vowels written in the Latin script; sounds are transcribed in the IPA:

 is color-coded as pink

Grammar 

The grammatical rules are may vary slightly in dialects; with the most divergence in Tarīno. Example:

Lexemes

Special words 
Dialects can also have special vocabulary:

Example:
ما دې دا خبرې ته کليس نه رسېژ

Compare:

زما دغه خبرې ته ذهن/عقل نه رسېږي

Derivative words 
These can be classed as deriving from "standard" Pashto

Lexical comparison

In general, the Karlani dialects, both in southern and northern varieties, show more vocabulary differences than the non-Karlani southern and northern dialects.

See also
Eastern Iranian languages
Proto-Indo-European language
Indo-Iranian languages

References

 

de:Paschtunische Sprache#Dialekte
pt:Língua pastó#Dialetos